Bennett  Salvatore (born January 9, 1950 in Stamford, Connecticut) is a former professional basketball referee in the National Basketball Association (NBA). At his retirement after the 2014-15 NBA season, Salvatore had officiated 1,520 regular season games.

Early life
Salvatore has lived his entire life in Stamford, Connecticut. He was a two sport athlete in high school, playing baseball and football.  He earned All-American and All-State honors as a quarterback in 1967 playing at C.W. Post.

NBA Referee
Salvatore became infamous with NBA fans for a key call against Dirk Nowitzki in Game 5 of the 2006 NBA Finals, after which Dallas owner Mark Cuban held one of the angriest press conferences in NBA history, laying blame on Salvatore for his team's loss.

Owner
Salvatore was the principal owner of Bennett's, a steakhouse in Stamford, Connecticut. One of his most intense athletic rivals in Stamford, and a lifelong friend, is former MLB manager Bobby Valentine. Valentine owns a competing restaurant in Stamford. 

On October 8, 2010, Salvatore closed the doors on Bennett's, choosing to retire from his career as a restaurant owner.

Income tax fraud
In 2000, he was sentenced to a year of probation, 150 hours of community service and a fine of $500 for his role in airline ticket fraud. He pleaded guilty in a New Haven federal court on July 26, 2000 to filing a false tax return with the Internal Revenue Service for the tax year 1993.

References

National Basketball Association referees
Living people
1950 births
American people of Italian descent
American people convicted of tax crimes
Sportspeople from Stamford, Connecticut
LIU Post alumni
Continental Basketball Association referees